= Benachi =

Mankapur
- Village
- Country: India
- State: Karnataka
- District: Dharwad

Government
  - Type: Pattan panchayat Alnavar

Population (2011)
  - Total: 1,982

Languages
  - Official: Kannada
- Time zone: UTC+5:30 (IST)
- ISO 3166 code: IN-KA
- Vehicle registration: KA
- Website: karnataka.gov.in

Mankapur is a village in Alnavar town Dharwad district of Karnataka, India.

== Demographics ==
As of the 2011 Census of India there were 382 households in Benachi and a total population of 1,982 consisting of 1,041 males and 941 females. There were 267 children ages 0-6.
